Manuel Albino Morim Maçães (born 19 December 1972), known as Bino, is a Portuguese former professional footballer who played as a central midfielder, currently a manager.

He appeared in 178 Primeira Liga games over 12 seasons, scoring a total of 14 goals for Porto, Salgueiros, Belenenses, Marítimo and Sporting CP. He won the championship with the first and last clubs, and also spent one year in La Liga with Tenerife.

Playing career

Club
Born in Póvoa de Varzim, Bino joined FC Porto's academy at the age of 14. He made his Primeira Liga debut with the first team on 30 March 1991, playing the second half of the 2–0 home win against S.C. Braga.

Bino spent the better part of the following seven seasons on loan, representing top-division sides S.C. Salgueiros, C.F. Os Belenenses and C.S. Marítimo and Rio Ave F.C. of the Segunda Liga. Of the three national championships he won while with Porto, he only contributed significantly in 1995–96, starting four times in 12 matches and scoring two goals.

In the summer of 1998, Bino signed with Sporting CP alongside teammate Rui Jorge, as Paulo Costinha and Emílio Peixe moved in the opposite direction. He made 12 appearances in the 1999–2000 campaign, helping the club win the domestic league for the first time in 18 years.

In July 2001, Bino moved abroad after agreeing to a contract at CD Tenerife. His first game in the Spanish La Liga took place on 9 September, in a 3–0 away loss to RC Celta de Vigo. He scored his only goal of the relegation-ending season in the return fixture the following January, a 1–1 draw at the Estadio Heliodoro Rodríguez López where he also played 90 minutes.

Bino returned to Marítimo and the Portuguese top flight on 16 July 2003, but featured sparingly during his two-year spell in Madeira. He retired at the age of 36 after four years with Moreirense FC, one in the second tier and three in the third.

International
Bino won his first cap for Portugal on 11 October 2000, starting and finishing a 2–0 away victory over the Netherlands for the 2002 FIFA World Cup qualifiers.

Coaching career
In 2010, Bino returned to Sporting as a scout. He subsequently rejoined Porto, as youth manager of Padroense F.C. who acted as the farm team.

In early 2014, following an assistant stint, Bino was appointed head coach of Porto's under-17s. He left the position in June 2017, being replaced by Mário Silva.

Bino signed a two-and-a-half-year deal at Vitória de Guimarães' reserves on 10 December 2019. On 5 April 2021 he became the third coach of the season at the helm of the first team, after the dismissal of João Henriques. Four days later on his professional management debut, the side lost 3–0 at Portimonense SC. He resigned on 13 May with two wins from seven, leaving Moreno to end the campaign as the club's fourth manager.

On 26 October 2021, Bino replaced Belenenses SAD-bound Filipe Cândido in charge of U.D. Leiria. Having been eliminated from the play-offs by F.C. Alverca in his one season in charge of the Liga 3 team, his contract was not renewed in May.

Managerial statistics

References

External links

1972 births
Living people
People from Póvoa de Varzim
Sportspeople from Porto District
Portuguese footballers
Association football midfielders
Primeira Liga players
Liga Portugal 2 players
Segunda Divisão players
FC Porto players
Rio Ave F.C. players
S.C. Salgueiros players
C.F. Os Belenenses players
C.S. Marítimo players
Sporting CP footballers
Moreirense F.C. players
La Liga players
Segunda División players
CD Tenerife players
Portugal youth international footballers
Portugal under-21 international footballers
Portugal international footballers
Portuguese expatriate footballers
Expatriate footballers in Spain
Portuguese expatriate sportspeople in Spain
Portuguese football managers
Primeira Liga managers
Vitória S.C. managers
U.D. Leiria managers